The Plattin Limestone is a Middle Ordovician geologic formation in Arkansas, Illinois, and Missouri. The name was first introduced in 1904 by Edward Oscar Ulrich in his study of the geology of Missouri. A type locality was designated at the mouth of the Plattin Creek in Jefferson County, Missouri, however a stratotype was not assigned. As of 2017, a reference section has not been designated. The name was introduced into Arkansas in 1927, replacing part of the, now abandoned, Izard Limestone.

See also

 List of fossiliferous stratigraphic units in Arkansas
 Paleontology in Arkansas

References

Ordovician Arkansas
Limestone